The Woman in the Window is a 2021 American psychological thriller film directed by Joe Wright from a screenplay by Tracy Letts, based on the 2018 novel of the same name by pseudonymous author A. J. Finn. The film follows an agoraphobic woman (Amy Adams) who begins to spy on her new neighbors (Gary Oldman, Fred Hechinger, and Julianne Moore) and is witness to a crime in their apartment. Anthony Mackie, Wyatt Russell, Brian Tyree Henry, and Jennifer Jason Leigh also star.

Produced by Fox 2000 Pictures, the last film released under the label, the film was originally scheduled to be theatrically released by 20th Century Fox in October 2019, but was delayed to May 2020, due to re-editing after poor test screenings. The theatrical release was later canceled due to the COVID-19 pandemic and its rights were sold to Netflix, which released the film on May 14, 2021. Upon release the film received negative reviews from critics, with most criticism aimed at Wright's direction and the screenplay, though the cast earned some praise.

Soon after its release Netflix also released The Woman in the House Across the Street from the Girl in the Window, an eight-episode series which parodied tropes from this film and others like it.

Plot
Child psychologist Anna Fox lives alone in a Manhattan brownstone after separating from her husband Edward; he lives away with their daughter Olivia, but she talks to them on a daily basis. Anna suffers from agoraphobia and her housebound state leads her to observe all of her neighbors from a second-storey window, including the Russell family who recently moved in across the street. She also takes a large number of medications and drinks heavily.

One evening, Jane Russell visits Anna and they befriend one another. She also meets Ethan, Jane's teenage son, who suggests his father Alistair is abusive. One night, Anna witnesses Jane being stabbed to death in the living room. She contacts the police but they do not believe her, claiming everyone in the family is fine. Alistair arrives along with "Jane" who, to the shock of Anna, is a different woman from the one she met. She begins spying on the Russell family.

Anna's tenant David, who lives in her basement, claims he did not hear or see anything, though she learns David was once in prison and broke his parole conditions. She receives an anonymous e-mail with a photo of her sleeping. She again contacts the detectives, who are joined by the Russells and David in Anna's house, and Anna breaks down when it is revealed by a detective that Edward and Olivia are dead as a result of a car crash that Anna accidentally caused. Anna is now agoraphobic as a result and her medication has caused her to have hallucinations and conversations with people who are not there.

Anna apologizes to the Russell family and stops pursuing her suspicions. She records a video on her cell phone, planning to commit suicide by overdose. She then discovers a photograph she took of her cat and, in the reflection of a wine glass, sees the original Jane, proving she is real. Anna shows David the photo and he confesses the original Jane she met is a woman named Katie Melli, Ethan's biological mother. Katie had been stalking the Russell family, trying to get close to Ethan. David refuses to help Anna prove the truth; he is then suddenly attacked and killed by Ethan, who had been lurking inside the house.

Ethan reveals to Anna that he murdered Katie and is a serial killer, having also killed Alistair's secretary in Boston, and now intends to kill Anna. He had been letting himself into her house all week with a stolen key, and he was the one who took the photo of her sleeping. Anna flees to the roof, where they fight until she pushes Ethan through the skylight to his death.

As Anna recovers in the hospital, Detective Little visits and tells her they have arrested Alistair and Jane for helping Ethan cover up Katie's murder and that they have found Katie's body. Little admits he watched Anna's suicide video, but hands back her phone to allow her to delete it before she has to return it for evidence. He apologizes for not believing her.

Nine months later, Anna, now sober and healthy, says goodbye to her house before she moves out and on with her life, now no longer afraid of the outside world.

Cast

Production

In September 2016, Fox 2000 Pictures acquired screen rights to the novel of the same name by A.J. Finn. In March 2018, it was announced Joe Wright would direct the film, from a screenplay by Tracy Letts, with Scott Rudin and Eli Bush serving as producers on the film. In April 2018, Amy Adams was set to star, and in July 2018, Julianne Moore, Wyatt Russell, Gary Oldman and Brian Tyree Henry joined the cast of the film. In August 2018, Fred Hechinger and Anthony Mackie were also added.

Principal photography began in New York City on August 6, 2018, and wrapped on October 30. Rudin later hired Tony Gilroy to perform rewrites for reshoots, following the film's initial delay from the October 4, 2019 release date. The score was originally set to be composed by Trent Reznor and Atticus Ross, but they were replaced by Danny Elfman.

Release 
The Woman in the Window was originally scheduled to be theatrically released on October 4, 2019, by 20th Century Fox, but on July 9, 2019, it was delayed, with Fox's new owner Walt Disney Studios Motion Pictures re-editing the film after test screenings, and a new release date of May 15, 2020 was set. On March 17, 2020, the film was removed from the release calendar due to the COVID-19 pandemic, with the intent to reschedule it for later in 2020, although those plans were later cancelled. On August 3, 2020, it was announced that Netflix was in final talks to acquire the distribution rights to the film from 20th Century Studios, which it did, releasing it on its streaming service on May 14, 2021. It was the final film to be released under the Fox 2000 label; as part of the Walt Disney Company's acquisition of 21st Century Fox, the label was discontinued.

Reception 
On Rotten Tomatoes, 25% of 212 reviews are positive, with an average rating of 4.6/10. The site's critics consensus reads, "A milquetoast and muddled thriller that drowns in its frenzied homages, The Woman in the Window will have audiences closing their curtains." On Metacritic, it has a weighted average score of 41 out of 100 based on 39 critics, indicating "mixed or average reviews".

Kate Erbland of IndieWire gave the film a "D+" and said, "While the film's acting runs the gamut between stilted and extreme, the rare moments when Wright brings his ensemble together crackle with the kind of nervy tension the rest of the film is missing. Mostly, though, there's the baffling: the interiority of Finn's novel works on the page, but blown out and, really, blown apart on the big screen, there's no mystery left." Writing for Variety, Owen Gleiberman said: "Tracy Letts is a vibrant playwright, but the dialogue in The Woman in the Window is weirdly stilted, like someone's chintzy mainstream-movie attempt at Pinter or Mamet. Adams's performance is by turns commanding and tremulously self-conscious. And stuff keeps happening that's so overwrought that the film, in its way, becomes a whirlpool of contrivance."

Some critics saw the film as a positive exploration of grief and agoraphobia.

Accolades

See also
 Rear Window (1954)
 Copycat (1995)

Notes

References

External links
 

2021 films
2021 psychological thriller films
2020s mystery thriller films
20th Century Studios films
Agoraphobia in fiction
American mystery thriller films
American psychological thriller films
English-language Netflix original films
Films about murder
Films about child abuse
Films based on American thriller novels
Films directed by Joe Wright
Films not released in theaters due to the COVID-19 pandemic
Films postponed due to the COVID-19 pandemic
Films produced by Scott Rudin
Films scored by Danny Elfman
Films set in apartment buildings
Films set in Manhattan
Films shot in New York City
Matricide in fiction
TSG Entertainment films
2020s English-language films
2020s American films